The San Lorenzo Zustinian class were a class of at least twenty-nine 70-gun third rate ships of the line built by the Venetian Arsenale from 1691 to 1746, in three different series with minor changes in the ships' length. It was the most numerous class of ship of the line built in Venice, and the last to see active service in a war against the Ottoman Empire in 1718. All this class' ships were planned before 1720, and the vast majority was launched before the Peace of Passarowitz. The last four vessels were completed to 70% in 1720s, then stored in the roofed shipbuilding docks of the Arsenale to be finished and launched between 1739 and 1746, a solution that was widely used with the following Leon Trionfante-class.

Those class ships were the first to enter service under the Venetian classification standards, devised by the Ammiraglio dell'Arsenal Stefano Antipa in 1694. In 1696, the Sol d'Oro, a vessel of this class, was the first ship launched with standardized colours in the Venetian sailing fleet.

Background and design 
After the losses of the ships San Marco Grande, Sant'Iseppo and Monton d'Oro weakened the Armada Grossa, the Senate decided lo launch two more (Venetian) first rate vessels. Those two ships, ordered in 1690, were intended to be part of the Giove Fulminante-class, and had to copy the waterlines of Costanza Guerriera, built by Iseppo Depieri di Piero some years before. Actually, only the first vessel, the Leon Coronato, built again by Depieri, respected those intentions: the second, baptized San Lorenzo Zustinian, was built by Stefano de Zuanne de Michiel and turned out to be quite different.

Although its design was derived from the previous class, the ship was bigger, having a beam of 38 Venetian feet (13.20 m), a keel length of 115 Ven. feet (39.95 m) and a normal draught of 16.55 Ven. feet (5.75 m). Moreover, it could embark 70 guns instead of 68, carrying at first 4 culverins and 24 20-pounder guns on the gundeck, 4 culverins and 24 14-pounder guns on the upper gundeck, 12 12-pounder guns on the quarterdeck and 2 14-pounder culverins on the forecastle. Being larger and longer than the Giove Fulminante, the San Lorenzo was more stable, and could also exit from Malamocco with the complete armament on board. For all these reasons, it was considered the first and namesake of a new ship of the line class, the most numerous ever built in the Arsenal.

Ships

First batch (1690–94)

Second batch (1695–1708)

Third batch (1714–1717)

Construction and developments 
The San Lorenzo Zustinian was built with the traditional "single frame" technique used at the time in the Venetian Arsenal, but with thicker pieces: the main frames were 22 cm thick instead of the 17 cm of the Giove Fulminante-class.
This experimental vessel was met with overall applause, and with a decree dated 19 December 1693 the Senate ordered to take her as model for new first rates construction. Stefano de Zuanne de Michiel, its designer and builder, was instructed to build another one with the same measures, that was eventually baptized Stella Maris, and two other vessels were ordered and laid down.

After the Battle of Chios (1694), the Venetian fleet, that lost in the fight two of her four most powerful vessels, the Leon Coronato and the newly built Stella Maris, found herself into a severe shortage of battleship. To answer this issue, the Senate ordered the immediate laying down of four new first rate vessel, built on the measures of the San Lorenzo but able to carry the newly designed 30-pounder guns on the gundeck and 20-pounders on the upper gundeck. To meet these requirements, the ships length was increased to 118 Venetian feet (41.03 m), thus originating the second batch of the San Lorenzo-class. Those ships structures was further strengthened, in order to sustain the stronger concussion of bigger guns, by inserting reinforcement ribbings between the frames under the waterline, a solution originally implemented on the captured Ottoman vessels Sant'Alvise, Santissima Annunziata and San Marco Grande in 1651.

Vessels of this batch were built throughout the following 13 years – the last was ordered in 1708 – and their aging design led to new problems. In the final stages of the Morean War, the San Lorenzo-class vessels, at the time the larger ships in Venetian service, started to embark 50-pounder guns on their gundecks. Moreover, part of those ships, finished in a great hurry during the war, were built with not properly seasoned wood, and deteriorated quickly. The need to sustain the stress of more powerful guns, and the arguments over the resistance of Venetian vessels born out of many cases of hogging in mothballed ships led shipbuilders to reinforce the internal structures of new vessels, and increase their frames thickness to 28.2 cm. The results were evident in the Colomba d'Oro and the Grand'Alessandro: being heavier, they drew more, and turned out to be slow in any wind condition.

To solve this problem, in 1702 Fabio Bonvicini, that had been Capitano Ordinario delle Navi during the war and was now a Senate member, proposed to build longer ships with thicker frames, able to carry 50-pounder guns, with reduced beam and smaller decks height. Only in 1708, winning the opposition of Arsenal's master builders, was laid down a ship that corresponded to Bonvicini suggestion, the Corona, launched in November 1711, but, due to arguments over the danger posed by rough sea to the big first rate ships, it was not replicated.

In the summer of 1714, when the Ottoman-Venetian War of 1714–1718 was about to start, the consistence of the Armata Grossa was reduced to only 22 vessels, mostly second and third rates. To reinforce the naval forces that were about to clash with a 40 vessels strong Ottoman fleet, the works ongoing on the last four vessels of the second batch were accelerated. As those ships were launched, six new first-rates were ordered and laid down in the Arsenal: they were still inspired by the San Lorenzo, but modified according to Bonvicini's notes. Those new vessels, able to carry 50-pounder guns on the gundeck and 30-pounders on the upper gundeck, had a keel length of 122 Venetian feet (42.38 m) and formed the third batch of the class.

See also
 Venetian Navy
 Arsenal of Venice
 Battle of Imbros (1717)

References

Notes

Citations

Bibliography 
 
 

 
Ship of the line classes
Ships built by the Venetian Arsenal
17th century in the Republic of Venice
18th century in the Republic of Venice